USS R-20 (SS-97) was an R-class coastal and harbor defense submarine of the United States Navy.

Construction and commissioning
R-20′s keel was laid down on 4 June 1917 by the Union Iron Works in San Francisco, California. She was launched on 21 January 1918, sponsored by Mrs. Arnold Foster, and commissioned on 26 October 1918 with Lieutenant Commander Alfred E. Montgomery in command.

Service history

1918–1931
Fitted out at San Pedro, California, R-20 remained off southern California operating between San Pedro and San Diego, California, until March 1919. She then moved to San Francisco, California; underwent overhaul, and on 17 June got underway for Hawaii. She arrived at Pearl Harbor's Naval Submarine Base Pearl Harbor on 25 June.

Given hull classification symbol SS-97 in July 1920, she served with the fleet training submarine personnel and assisting in the development of submarine equipment and tactics for over a decade. On 12 December 1930, she departed Pearl Harbor and headed for Philadelphia, Pennsylvania, and inactivation. She arrived at Philadelphia on 9 February 1931; decommissioned on 15 May; and was berthed at League Island.

1941–1946
R-20 recommissioned on 22 January 1941. In April she shifted to New London, Connecticut. There she trained personnel and conducted patrols until June. She then moved south to Key West, Florida, arriving on 22 June to spend the remainder of her career as a training ship.

R-20 decommissioned at Key West on 27 September 1945 and was struck from the Naval Vessel Register the following month. On 13 March 1946, she was sold to Macey O. Scott of Miami, Florida.

References

External links
 

R-20 (SS-97)
World War I submarines of the United States
World War II submarines of the United States
Ships built in San Francisco
1918 ships